Luciano Floridi (born 16 November 1964) is an Italian and British philosopher. He holds a double appointment as professor of philosophy and ethics of information at the University of Oxford, Oxford Internet Institute where is also Governing Body Fellow of Exeter College, Oxford, and as Professor of Sociology of Culture and Communication at the University of Bologna, Department of Legal Studies, where he is the director of the Centre for Digital Ethics. He is adjunct professor ("distinguished scholar in residence"), Department of Economics, American University, Washington D.C. At the end of the academic year 2022-2023, Floridi will move to Yale, becoming the Founding Director of the institution’s Digital Ethics Center. He is married to the neuroscientist Anna Christina Nobre.

Floridi is best known for his work on two areas of philosophical research: the philosophy of information, and information ethics (also known as digital ethics or computer ethics), for which he received many awards, including the Knight of the Grand Cross of the Order of Merit, Italy’s most prestigious honour. According to Scopus, Floridi was the most cited living philosopher in the world in 2020.

Between 2008 and 2013, he held the research chair in philosophy of information and the UNESCO Chair in Information and Computer Ethics at the University of Hertfordshire. He was the founder and director of the IEG, an interdepartmental research group on the philosophy of information at the University of Oxford, and of the GPI the research Group in Philosophy of Information at the University of Hertfordshire. He was the founder and director of the SWIF, the Italian e-journal of philosophy (1995–2008). He is a former Governing Body Fellow of St Cross College, Oxford.

Early life and education 
Floridi was born in Rome in 1964, and studied at Rome University La Sapienza (laurea, first class with distinction, 1988), where he was originally educated as a historian of philosophy. He soon became interested in analytic philosophy and wrote his tesi di laurea (roughly equivalent to an M.A. thesis) in philosophy of logic, on Michael Dummett's anti-realism. He obtained his Master of Philosophy (1989) and PhD degree (1990) from the University of Warwick, working in epistemology and philosophy of logic with Susan Haack (who was his PhD supervisor) and Michael Dummett. Floridi's early student years are partly recounted in the non-fiction book The Lost Painting: The Quest for a Caravaggio Masterpiece, where he is "Luciano". During his graduate and postdoctoral years, he covered the standard topics in analytic philosophy in search of a new methodology. He sought to approach contemporary problems from a heuristically powerful and intellectually enriching perspective when dealing with lively philosophical issues. During his graduate studies, he began to distance himself from classical analytic philosophy. In his view, the analytic movement had lost its way. For this reason, he worked on pragmatism (especially Peirce) and foundationalist issues in epistemology and philosophy of logic, as well as the history of scepticism.

Academic career and previous positions 
Floridi started his academic career as a lecturer in philosophy at the University of Warwick in 1990–1991. He joined the Faculty of Philosophy of the University of Oxford in 1990 and the OUCL (Oxford's Department of Computer Science) in 1999. He was junior research fellow (JRF) in philosophy at Wolfson College, Oxford University (1990–1994), a Frances Yates Fellow in the History of Ideas at the Warburg Institute, University of London (1994–1995) and Research Fellow in philosophy at Wolfson College, Oxford University (1994–2001). During these years in Oxford, he held lectureships in different Colleges. Between 1994 and 1996, he also held a post-doctoral research scholarship at the Department of Philosophy, University of Turin. Between 2001 and 2006, he was Markle Foundation Senior Research Fellow in Information Policy at the Programme in Comparative Media Law and Policy, Oxford University. Between 2002 and 2008, he was Associate Professor of Logic at the Università degli Studi di Bari. In 2006, he became Fellow by Special Election of St Cross College, Oxford University, where he played for the squash team. In 2008, he was appointed full professor of philosophy at the University of Hertfordshire, to hold the newly established research chair in philosophy of information and, in 2009, the UNESCO Chair in Information and Computer Ethics, a position position which he held until 2013, when he moved back to Oxford.

In 2017, Floridi became a Fellow of the Alan Turing Institute and the Chair of its Data Ethics Group, holding these positions until 2021 and 2020, respectively.

Since 2010 he has been Editor-in-Chief of Philosophy & Technology (Springer).

In January 2023, Floridi announced he would move to Yale at the beginning of the academic year 2023-2024, to take over the position of Founding Director of the Yale Digital Ethics Center.

Philosophical views 
Floridi is one of the leading thinkers in the emerging disciplines of the philosophy of information, the philosophy of technology, information ethics, digital ethics, and the ethics of AI. His work has helped to establish the philosophical and ethical study of information as a distinct and important field of inquiry.

Floridi's work focuses on the philosophical, ethical, social, and political implications of the increasing role that information and communication technologies play in our lives. He is particularly concerned with the increasing digitization of our world, the conceptual and ethical implications of the changing relationship between humans and technology, and the need for a new philosophical framework to accommodate these changes.

He argues that we need to develop a new ethical approach to understand and shape the changes brought about by the information revolution, and that the latest developments in technology and science must inform this approach. He has been instrumental in promoting the development of digital ethics, interacting with governments and companies worldwide.

One of Floridi's key contributions is his formulation of the 'Philosophy of Information' (PoI). The PoI provides a framework for understanding the nature of information and its role in the world. According to Floridi, information is a vital resource that shapes our knowledge and understanding of the world. It is not simply a neutral representation of reality but a part of the world, with its own properties, effects, and moral implications.

Floridi's PoI has several key components including an 'ontology of information', which defines the nature of information, an 'ethics of information', which provides a framework for evaluating the moral implications of information and information technologies, an ‘epistemology of information’, that analyses the role of information in the development of knowledge and science, and a ‘logic of information’, the concentrates on the more formal aspects. The PoI also includes a theory of the 'information environment', the infosphere, which encompasses the physical, social, and cultural contexts in which information is produced, used, and communicated.

Floridi's work has profoundly impacted the field of digital ethics and the philosophy and ethics of AI, and has helped establish them as distinct and important areas of inquiry. He has written more than 300 papers and many books on the subject, including:

"Information: A Very Short Introduction" (OUP, 2010) - An overview of the concept of information, including its history, definition, and applications.

"The Philosophy of Information" (OUP, 2011) – An analysis of the concept of information and its implications for philosophy, ethics, and society.

"The Ethics of Information" (OUP, 2013) - An examination of the moral and ethical implications of the Information Age.

"The Fourth Revolution: How the Infosphere is Reshaping Human Reality" (OUP, 2014) – A study of how the digital revolution is transforming our understanding of reality and shaping our identities and lives.

"The Logic of Information" (OUP, 2019) - An exploration of the formal aspects of the dynamics of logic and the abstract foundations of the nature of information, combining insights from philosophy, computer science, and the social sciences.

He has edited many books, and The Onlife Manifesto - Being Human in a Hyperconnected Era is the most successful book published by Springer, with almost 1m accesses.

Floridi's work has been widely cited and is highly regarded in the academic community. He is also a sought-after speaker and commentator on digital issues, and has given many public lectures and interviews on these subjects (see YouTube channel). He is engaged with emerging policy initiatives on the socio-ethical value and implications of digital technologies and their applications, working closely on digital/data ethics (including the ethics of algorithms and AI) with the House of Commons, the House of Lords, the Cabinet Office, FCA, DCMS, ICO, the Centre for Data Ethics and Innovation, and internationally with the European Parliament, the European Commission, the Council of Europe, UNESCO, the German Ethics Council, Italy’s Camera dei Deputati, as well as with many multinational corporations (e.g. Barclays, Capgemini, Cisco, DeepMind, Deloitte, EY, Facebook, Google, IBM, Fujitsu, Generali, Leonardo, McKinsey, Microsoft, Poste Italiane, Snam, Sogeti, Tencent, Vodafone, and Volkswagen).

Recognitions and awards 
2022 - Knight of the Grand Cross - First Class of the Order of Merit (Cavaliere di Gran Croce Ordine al Merito della Repubblica Italiana, the highest honour in the Italian Republic), awarded through a special decree by the President of the Italian Republic Sergio Mattarella for his work on the philosophy and ethics of information.

2022 - Fellow of the Accademia delle Scienze dell’Istituto di Bologna

2021 - Honorary Doctorate (Laurea honoris causa) in Informatics, University of Skövde, Sweden, for “his groundbreaking work on the philosophy of information”.

2020 - Premio Udine Filosofia, Mimesis Festival, for The Logic of Information (OUP, 2019)

2020 - Premio Socrate, Cesare Landa Foundation, for philosophical communication

2019 - CogX Award, for “outstanding achievement in ethics of AI”

2019 - Gilbert Ryle Lectures, Trent University

2019 - Premio Aretè “Maestro della Responsabilità”, Nuvolaverde, Confindustria, Gruppo 24 Ore Salone della CSR e dell’innovazione sociale, for ethics of communication

2018 - Thinker Award, IBM, for AI Ethics

2018 - Premio Conoscenza, Conferenza dei Rettori delle Università Italiane (CRUI, equivalent of Universities UK)), for achievements in research and communication about digital ethics

2017 - Fellow of the Academy of Social Sciences

2016 - J. Ong Award, Media Ecology Association, for The Fourth Revolution (OUP, 2016)

2016 - Copernicus Scientist Award, Institute for Advanced Studies of the University of Ferrara, in recognition of research in the ethics and philosophy of information

2015 - Fernand Braudel Senior Fellow, European University Institute

2014-15 - Cátedras de Excelencia, University Carlos III of Madrid, for research in philosophy and ethics of information

2013 - Member of the Académie Internationale de Philosophie des Sciences

2013 - Fellow of the British Computer Society

2013 - Weizenbaum Award, International Society for Ethics and Information Technology, for “very significant contribution to the field of information and computer ethics, through his research, service, and vision”

2012 - Covey Award, International Association for Computing and Philosophy, for “outstanding research in computing and philosophy”

2011-12 - Fellow, Center for Information Policy Research, University of Wisconsin–Milwaukee

2011 - Honorary Doctorate (Laurea honoris causa) in philosophy, University of Suceava, Romania, for “his leading research in the philosophy and ethics of information”

2011 - Fellow, World Technology Network, NY, in the category “ethics and technology”

2010 - Vice Chancellor Research Award, University of Hertfordshire

2009 - Fellow of the Society for the Study of Artificial Intelligence and the Simulation of Behaviour (AIBS)

2009-10 - Gauss Professor of the Akademie der Wissenschaften, Göttingen, in recognition of research in the philosophy of information (first philosopher to receive the award, generally given to mathematicians or physicists)

2009 - Barwise Prize, American Philosophical Association, for “outstanding research in ethics and philosophy of information”

1998 - Premio WWW98, “Il Sole 24 Ore”, for online editorial work as Director of SWIF, the Italian Web Site for Philosophy

Books and other works 
A list of Floridi's books can be found on his author page.  A list of his academic publications is available on Google Scholar. Open access articles and papers are also available through SSRN.

Podcasts and videos 
See Floridi's official YouTube channel.

See also 
 Digital physics
 Information theory
 Logic of information
 Philosophy of artificial intelligence
 Philosophy of technology
 Philosophy of information

Notes

External links 

Home page and articles online
"We dislike the truth and love to be fooled" – Interview of Luciano Floridi on Cyceon, 21 November 2016
Interview for RAI International, Taccuino Italiano, 5 March 2008 (in Italian)
Interview for the American Philosophical Association — Philosophy And Computing Newsletter
Biography, in English

1964 births
20th-century educational theorists
20th-century essayists
20th-century Italian historians
20th-century Italian male writers
20th-century Italian philosophers
21st-century educational theorists
21st-century essayists
21st-century Italian historians
21st-century Italian male writers
21st-century Italian philosophers
Academics of the University of Hertfordshire
Alumni of the University of Warwick
Analytic philosophers
Artificial intelligence ethicists
Artificial intelligence researchers
Computer science writers
Education writers
Epistemologists
Fellows of St Cross College, Oxford
Fellows of the SSAISB
Fellows of Wolfson College, Oxford
Internet theorists
Italian educational theorists
Italian ethicists
Italian historians of philosophy
Italian logicians
Italian male essayists
Italian male non-fiction writers
Italian social commentators
Italian technology writers
Literacy and society theorists
Living people
Members of the Department of Computer Science, University of Oxford
Members of the International Academy of Philosophy of Science
Metaphilosophers
Metaphysicians
Metaphysics writers
Ontologists
Philosophers of culture
Philosophers of education
Philosophers of history
Philosophers of logic
Philosophers of science
Philosophers of social science
Philosophers of technology
Philosophy academics
Philosophy of artificial intelligence
Sapienza University of Rome alumni
Social philosophers
Theorists on Western civilization
Writers about globalization